Elkton High School (EHS) is a public high school in Elkton, Oregon, United States. It is part of the Elkton School District and is the only high school in Elkton.

Academics
In 2008, 59% of the school's seniors received a high school diploma. Of 22 students, 13 graduated, six dropped out, one received a modified diploma, and two were still in high school in 2009.`

References

High schools in Douglas County, Oregon
Charter schools in Oregon
Public high schools in Oregon